The  (part of Asian Highway Network ) is an expressway in Japan, which extends from Suita, Osaka to Shimonoseki, Yamaguchi. It connects Kansai and Chūgoku regions in western Honshu, Japan's main island. Other major cities along the expressway are Tsuyama, Kobe, and Hiroshima.

It is connected with many other expressways, including the Meishin Expressway at Suita Junction and Kanmon Bridge at Shimonoseki Interchange through to the Kyushu Expressway.

List of interchanges and features

 IC - interchange, SIC - smart interchange, JCT - junction, SA - service area, PA - parking area, BS - bus stop, TN - tunnel, TB - toll gate, BR - bridge
 Bus stops labeled "○" are currently in use; those marked "◆" are closed.

Accidents
On 5 October 2013, comedian and singer Yakkun Sakurazuka died in an accident on the Chugoku Expressway in Mine, Yamaguchi, while en route to a concert in Kumamoto Prefecture. He was hit by another car and killed after exiting his car following a crash.

References

AH1
Expressways in Japan
Roads in Hiroshima Prefecture
Roads in Hyōgo Prefecture
Roads in Okayama Prefecture
Roads in Osaka Prefecture
Roads in Shimane Prefecture
Roads in Yamaguchi Prefecture